J.T. Dixon (full name and dates of birth and death unknown) was an English cricketer.  Dixon's batting style is unknown, though it is known he bowled right-arm slow-medium.

Dixon lived in British Hong Kong in the early 1900s, while there he played three Interport Matches for the Hong Kong cricket team against Shanghai in 1903 and 1904 and the Straits Settlements in 1904.  Later, when back in England, Dixon made a single first-class appearance for Middlesex against Gloucestershire at Ashley Down Ground, Bristol in the 1908 County Championship.  Dixon was dismissed for 7 runs in Middlesex's first-innings by George Dennett, while in their second-innings he was dismissed for a duck by the same bowler.  Middlesex won the match by the narrow margin of 2 runs.  This was his only major appearance for Middlesex.

References

External links
J.T. Dixon at ESPNcricinfo
J.T. Dixon at CricketArchive

English cricketers
Middlesex cricketers
British expatriates in Hong Kong
Year of birth missing
Year of death missing
Place of birth missing
Place of death missing